Katsuhiro Maeda (born June 23, 1971) is a former Japanese professional baseball pitcher. He played for the Seibu Lions of Nippon Professional Baseball (NPB).

Maeda pitched for the Seibu Lions for three years. The Lions sold Maeda to the New York Yankees of Major League Baseball for $350,000 in 1996. In 2004, Maeda signed with Shanghai Eagles of the China Baseball League, becoming the first Japanese player to play in China.

References

External links

1971 births
Living people
Columbus Clippers players
Expatriate baseball players in China
Fortitudo Baseball Bologna players
Gulf Coast Yankees players
Japanese expatriate baseball players in Italy
Japanese expatriate baseball players in the United States
Japanese expatriate sportspeople in China
Nippon Professional Baseball pitchers
Norwich Navigators players
Seibu Lions players
Shanghai Golden Eagles players
Baseball people from Kobe
Tampa Yankees players
Japanese expatriate baseball players in Taiwan
Sinon Bulls players